The Aktobe Region is a region of Kazakhstan. The name Aktobe comes from Kazakh aq 'white' and töbe 'hill' or 'top (of something)'; supposedly, Aktobe's initial settlers were able to see white mountains far to the north.  The Aktobe regional capital is the city of Aktobe. The region is located in the western part of Kazakhstan. Its area is 300,629 km2 (second-largest in Kazakhstan), which is 11 per cent of the territory of Kazakhstan. The population is 909 673 as of June 1, 2022.

It was formed as a result of the administrative-territorial reform on March 10, 1932 as part of the cossack KSSR. Historically, it was preceded by the Aktobe district, which existed in 1921-1928. In 1936, the region became part of the Kazakh SSR separated from the RSFSR and since 1991, after the collapse of the USSR, as part of the independent Republic of Kazakhstan.

The region is bordered to the North by the Orenburg Oblast of Russia, to the northeast by the Kostanay Region, to the Southeast by the Karaganda and Kyzylorda regions of Kazakhstan, to the South by the Republic of Karakalpakstan of Uzbekistan, to the southwest by the Mangystau Region, to the West by the Atyrau Region and to the Northwest by the West Kazakhstan Region of Kazakhstan.

The administrative center is the largest city of Western Kazakhstan, Aktobe (from 1891 to 1999 — Aktyubinsk hence the name of the region).

Geography
The area of the region is 300,600 square kilometers, making it the second largest region of Kazakhstan, after Karaganda Region. Aktobe Region borders Russia (Orenburg Oblast) to the north and Uzbekistan (Karakalpakstan) to the south, and also borders six other Kazakh regions: the Atyrau Region to the west, the Mangystau Region to the south-west, the Karaganda Region to the east, the Kostanay Region to the north-east, the Kyzylorda Region to the south-east, and the West Kazakhstan Region to the north-west. The Ilek River, a tributary of the Ural River, flows through the region. The Barsuki Desert is an arid, sandy area of the region.

Demographics

Ethnic groups

Religion

Administrative divisions
The region is administratively divided into twelve districts and the city of Aktobe.
 Alga District, with the administrative center in the town of Alga;
 Ayteke Bi District, the selo of Komsomol;
 Bayganin District, the selo of Karauilkeldy;
 Kargaly District, the settlement of Badamsha;
 Khromtau District, the town of Khromtau;
 Kobda District, the aul of Kobda;
 Martuk District, the selo of Martuk;
 Mugalzhar District, the town of Kandyagash;
 Oiyl District, the selo of Oiyl;
 Shalkar District, the town of Shalkar;
 Temir District, the town of Temir;
 Yrgyz District, the selo of Yrgyz.

* Eight localities in Aktobe Region have town status. These are Aktobe, Alga, Embi, Kandyagash, Khromtau, Shalkar,  Temir, and Zhem.
* Two more localities - Shubarkuduk and Shubarshi - have status of urban-type settlement.

Economy 
Aktobe region is a large industrial region of Kazakhstan. The basis of the industrial sector is the mining and chemical industries, ferrous metallurgy. Mineral reserves are: gas - 144.9 billion m³, oil - 243.6 million tons, oil and gas condensate - 32.7 million tons. There are large deposits of chromite (1st place in the CIS), nickel-cobalt ores, phosphorite, potassium salts, etc. 

In 2019, the gross regional product of the region amounted to 6,841.2 million US dollars, of which industry is 35.2% and agriculture 5.1%. GRP per capita is 7.8 thousand US dollars.

Industry 
Aktobe region is a large industrially developed region of Kazakhstan. All chrome ore mining, production of chrome salts, roentgen equipment and more than a quarter of Kazakhstan's ferroalloys are concentrated here. The leading sector of the region's economy is industry. It has a multi-industry structure and includes: mining

and oil and gas processing industry, ferrous and non-ferrous metallurgy, mechanical engineering, chemical, light and food industries, production of building materials.

In 2019, the manufacturing sector produced products worth 600 billion tenge. In the structure of manufacturing production, the largest share is occupied by:

• Ferroalloy production – 47%

• production of chromium salts – 14.2%

• production of rail products – 9.7%

Prospects for the development of this industry are related to the production of high-precision, high-tech and high-tech products. As of June 1, 2020 were registered 1,617 enterprises in industrial production, including 645 operating ones.

Large enterprise:

• Enterprise for the extraction of chrome ore and concentrates of «TNK  Kazchrom» LLP

• Oil-producing enterprises of  «SNPS-Aktobemunay gas», «Kazakhoil Aktobe» LLP

• Plant for the production of chemical compounds of «Aktobe plant of chrome compounds» LLP

• Plant for the production of rail products «Aktobe rail and beam plant» LLP

• Enterprise for the extraction of copper ore and concentrates «Aktobe copper company» LLP

• Enterprise for the extraction of chrome ore and concentrates «Voskhod-Oriel» LLP

• Gold ore mining «AltynEx»  Company

Agriculture 
The total area of agricultural land in the Aktobe region as of 01.01.2020 is 10 672,3 hectares, including pastures – 9434,4 hectares, arable land – 715,8 hectares, hayfields – 133,8 hectares, perennial plantations – 0,6 hectares, vegetable gardens – 0,6 hectares, other land-139.2 hectares.

Gross output of agricultural products (services) in the region as a whole in 2019 amounted to 275.2 billion tenge, which is 3.7% higher than in the corresponding period of the previous year.

Over the past three years, the growth of gross output was 136.6%.

The main directions of development of the agro-industrial complex of the region are animal husbandry, while crop production is also developing. In the livestock sector, the gross output in 2019 was 174.7 billion rubles.tenge, crop production 99.4 billiontenge.

The growth in agricultural production in 2019 is due to an increase in the volume of slaughtering of livestock and poultry in live weight by 8.5%, milk yield of raw cow's milk – by 3.2%, chicken eggs - by 2.6%.

As of January 1, 2020. compared to the same date last year, in all categories of farms, the number of horses increased by 12.1% and amounted to 144.3 thousand heads, cattle – by 6.3% and 493.5 thousand heads, respectively; sheep – by 1.2% and 981.2 thousand heads; goats – by 4.6% and 145.8 thousand heads; poultry – by 7.7% and 1310.5 thousand heads; camels – 1.9% and 17.8 thousand heads; pigs – by 1.8% and 58.4 thousand heads;.

According to the approved structure of crops in 2020, crops are planned to be sown on an area of 787.0 thousand hectares, including

457.3 thousand hectares of grain and leguminous crops, 35.2 thousand hectares of oilseeds, 282.2 thousand hectares of forage crops, 6.3 thousand hectares of potatoes, 5.9 thousand hectares of vegetable and melon crops.

To further increase the gross agricultural output, the "program for the development of the agro-industrial complex of the Aktobe region for 2020-2025"was developed. In accordance with this program, it is planned to increase labor productivity in the agro-industrial complex and export of processed agricultural products by at least 2.5 times over 5 years compared to 2017. At the same time, by 2025, it is planned to increase the volume of gross output in the region to 444.5 billion rubles.tenge, including 289.0 billion in livestock production.tenge, crop production 155.5 billion.tenge.

Transportation 
The length of public roads in Aktobe region is 6,856. 6 km, including 1,894 km of national, 1,262. 8 km of regional and 3,699. 8 km of district significance. To date, the share of roads in good and satisfactory condition of national significance is 56.5% or 1,061 km, and local significance is 56.5% or 2,829. 3 km. The region has highways of national significance «Samara-Shymkent», «Aktobe-Kandyagash-Emba-Shalkar», «Aktobe-Martuk», «Aktobe-Orsk», «Aktobe-Atyrau-border of the Russian Federation (to Astrakhan)». There are highways of regional significance «Kobda-Martuk», «Pokrovka-Temir-Kenkiyak-Emba», «Shubarkuduk-Uil-Kobda-Sol-Iletsk», «Aktobe-Orsk»-«Badamsha-Don», «Aktobe-Rodnikovka-Martuk», «Shalkar-Bozoy-border RU (on Nukus)», «Aktobe-Bolgarka-Shubarkuduk», «Aktobe-Orsk», «Petropavlovsk-Khazretovka».

In the region, passengers and Luggage are transported by 20 carriers with private ownership. There are 80 routes, including 52 urban, 17 intra regional, 5 – inter regional and 6-international routes that connect the region's settlements with the cities of Russia-Orsk, Orenburg, Samara, Novotroitsk, Kazan, and St. Petersburg.

There are 1 bus station (in the city of Aktobe) and 2 bus stations (in the city of Aktobe, Khromtau) and 1 passenger service point in the village of Komsomol. In other regional centers of the region there are cash points for the sale of travel documents.

2 carriers carry out regular urban passenger transportation in the regional center of Aktobe: «vehicle fleet» LLP and «PMTP» LLP. 52 routes are served, and more than 400 large, medium and small-capacity buses are used.

Social sphere

Culture 
In Aktobe region currently, there are 4 regional libraries, 1 folk art center, 1 philharmonic hall, 2 theaters, 19 museums, 13 archives, 1 planetarium and 1 center for patriotic education.

The regional philharmonic named after G. Zhubanova has 10 creative groups. Creative teams take part in many national and international competitions and festivals, widely promote the art of the Kazakh people, take prizes, and make a huge contribution to the development of the region.

The regional center of folk art organizes and conducts cultural events of various directions. The center works to coordinate, promote and distribute folk art, coordinate the activities of cultural and leisure institutions in the region and organizations.there are creative teams that have 156 «folk» and «exemplary» titles.

New productions are prepared on the theater stages every year. Every year, the theater covers more than 60 thousand spectators, the theater's repertoire is replenished with about 10 new productions. Creative achievements of the theater team have been repeatedly noted in various directing and acting fields.

Regional libraries, museums and archives are annually replenished with new funds. In order to activate the industry, funds are being digitalized.

In addition, the region has the country's first stationary planetarium. Since 2008, Aktobe planetarium has become a member of the Association of cooperation, which includes about 100 Russian and Eurasian planetariums.

In the village of Aliya, Kobda district of Aktobe region, there is a regional center for patriotic education «Aliya». The center has all conditions for holding cultural and sports events and recreation for young people. The center works in close contact with war and labor veterans, museums in the Moscow, St. Petersburg, Pskov, and Ural regions, where the heroine was raised , studied, and fought.

Sport
There are 31 children's and youth sport schools in Aktobe region, including 14 regional children's and youth sport schools, the school of higher sport skills, the Olympic reserve center, 4 city and 12 district of youth sport schools and 1 children's and youth sport school based on the Aktobe Ferroalloy plant, where about 19 thousand children and teenagers are engaged.

In 2016, a specialized boarding school-College (SBSG) of the Eset Batyr Olympic reserve was opened in Aktobe.

In SHIK sport, athletes study and train in 9 sports (Boxing, football, Greco-Roman, table tennis, athletics, taekwondo, freestyle wrestling, judo, and skiing).

The regional center has a club for people with disabilities,  the national teams of the Republic of Kazakhstan from the region include 38 people with disabilities.

86 sports are cultivated in the region, including 33 Olympic, 38 not Olympic, 7 technical, 8 national sports, including 22 sports among athletes with disabilities.

The city is home to the famous football club FC «Aktobe» which dates back to 1967, when the team «Aktyubinets» was awarded the status of a team of masters.

The 2008 season turned out to be a Golden season for the team, so Aktobe becomes the only club in the history of Kazakhstan football that managed to win all three honorary titles — the Cup, super Cup and gold medals of the national championship.

Aktobe region is rightly proud of its sport history and its glorious traditions.

Any sport has its own Champions - G. Jafarov (Boxing), Shakharov A., Kusherbayeva G., Utarbayev S., Ibraev R., Kuanov E., Baylieva R. (Sambo, judo), F. Harki (weightlifting), Ainagulov M., Sisenbayev A., Zhalgasov D., Asembayev T., Izimgali S. (Greco-Roman wrestling), Sagandykov R., Aktauov A, Azhikanov N., Bolat M., Muratov A. (karate-do), Goncharov E. (kettlebell lifting), A. Tarabrin, Kamzenov A., Nazarova D., Khudyakov V. (Swimming), Zhanibekova O., Sanaev N., Batyrmurzaev Yu. (freestyle wrestling), Kisykov B., Sergazin A., Yerzhanov Sh., Sagynbaev A. (national sports) Deleuran B. (skiing), Sh. Zhuldaspayev, G. Kurmanbayeva, Kholostenko M., Tineev K., Esengosuly M., Malaydar B. (athletes with disabilities), Petukhov A., Amanzhol H., Zhakeev M., Kineeva D. (intellectual sports), Zhumagulov Zh., S. Morozov, G. Dazaev (MMA), and many others.

In recent years, the Aktobe region has been actively building and commissioning sport facilities, which is also attractive for large-scale, level-level sport events.

So, in 2017, the sports complex  «Zhekpe-Zhek» was built for 730 seats.

In order to develop winter sports, the hockey module of the youth sport school №5 «Olymp» was built for 200 seats.

In 2018, the construction of an Ice complex with 2,500 seats was completed.

A tennis center with 114-seat hotel rooms has been put into operation. It consists of 4 indoor and 4 outdoor courts that meet international standards.

A roller ski track and a Triathlon Park with a 2.5 km bike and running track are also under construction.

At the national Winter Spartakiad 2013, the regional bandy team became the champion.

Tourism 
Today in the Aktobe region there are 75 sacred objects, including 27 objects of national and 48 local significance. The most popular among them are sacred objects of national significance: the «Eset Batyr» mausoleum complex, the «Kobylandy Batyr» memorial complex, the  «Abat Baitak» mausoleum, the «Khan molasy» necropolis, the «Keruen Saray» complex and the «Kotibar Batyr Basenuly» mausoleum.

Currently, in addition to visiting sacred and cultural and historical sites, the following types of tourism are popular in the Aktobe region:

- ecological tourism: Kargaly reservoir (sturgeon ponds, Aschelisay(«wolf») waterfall), chalk mountains «Aktolagay» (Baiganin district), Irgiz-Turgay Nature Reserve (Irgiz district);

- therapeutic- sanative (medical) tourism: the sanatorium-pantoleonta «Zaru» (Martuk district), sanatorium dispensary «Shipager» (Alga district), sands «Barkyn (Uil district);

- entertainment tourism: aqua park «Tree of life Aktobe», recreation and entertainment park «Green land», recreation park «Yurta park».

There is also a tourist portal dedicated to the region www.visitaktobe.kz, tourist information desks are installed at the airport and on the Arbat in Aktobe.

On August 24, 2019 the first international tourist festival «Qarg'aly Fest» was held. The number of participants is more than 4,000 people.

See also
Aral Sea
Mugodzhar Hills
Southern Ural Mountains

References

External links
 Official Site (in Kazakh and Russian)
 

 
Regions of Kazakhstan